Acadian Asset Management (Acadian) is an American investment management firm headquartered in Boston with additional offices in London, Singapore and Sydney. The firm is noted for its usage of Quantitative analysis and strategies when making investment decisions.

Background 

The firm's predecessor, Acadian Financial Research, was founded in 1977 by Gary Bergstrom. It managed investment strategies for the State Street Corporation. In 1986, Acadian Asset Management was founded by Bergstrom, John Chisholm, Churchill Franklin, Ron Frashure to manage assets independently. The firm's name comes from the region, Acadia.

Acadian is an active manager and relies on fields such as artificial intelligence and data science to supplement its decision making process.

In 1992, Acadian was acquired by United Asset Management. In 2000, Acadian became a subsidiary of Old Mutual after Old Mutual acquired United Asset Management.

In 2009, Acadian laid off 8% of its workforce due to volatile market conditions related to the Financial crisis of 2007–2008.

In March 2017, Acadian partnered with Microsoft to use its Bing predicts big data technology to support its investment decision making process. However only several months later, it ended its partnership stating it had not found a way to turn social media data into useful signals for investments.

In 2018, the direct parent of Acadian, Old Mutual Asset Management separated from Old Mutual and was rebranded to BrightSphere Investment Group.

Acadian claims to be the first quantitative fund to sign the Principles for Responsible Investment in 2009.

References

External links
 

1986 establishments in Massachusetts
Financial services companies established in 1986
Companies based in Boston
Investment companies of the United States